Banco Popular Dominicano is a banking institution in the Dominican Republic which was established more than five decades ago. The company, which is known popularly in the Dominican Republic as Banco Popular, was chosen in 2021 by Global Finance magazine as the best private bank company in the Dominican Republic.

Brief history
The bank was founded in 1963, (some sources say 1964) by Dominican banker Alejandro Grullón. He was president of the company for 25 years.

In 1990, Grullon's son, Manuel Alejandro Grullón, was elected president of the bank. He has held that position ever since.

In 1998, Banco Popular Dominicano founded a television channel, CDN 37.

On September 3, 2019, Banco Popular Dominicano as a company became a signer of the United Nations initiative, UNEP FI.

Competitors
The bank company's main competitors in the Dominican Republic include Banco León and, until 2003, Banco Intercontinental.

See also
Banks of the Dominican Republic

External links

Brands of the Dominican Republic
Banks of the Dominican Republic